Fly Creek Methodist Church, also known as First Methodist Episcopal Society in Fly Creek, is a historic Methodist church on County Route 26, north of the junction with conjoined NY 28 and NY 80 in Fly Creek, Otsego County, New York. It was built in 1838 and is a plain, clapboarded, timber-frame building on a fieldstone foundation with a frontal gable in the Greek Revival style. The interior configuration is a modification of the Akron plan. It is located within the  boundaries of the Fly Creek Historic District.

It was listed on the National Register of Historic Places in 1996.

References

Individually listed contributing properties to historic districts on the National Register in New York (state)
Methodist churches in New York (state)
Churches on the National Register of Historic Places in New York (state)
Churches completed in 1838
19th-century Methodist church buildings in the United States
Greek Revival church buildings in New York (state)
Churches in Otsego County, New York
Akron Plan church buildings
National Register of Historic Places in Otsego County, New York
1838 establishments in New York (state)